Wavy may refer to:

 "Wavy" (Ty Dolla Sign song), 2016
 "Wavy" (Muroki song), 2021
 WAVY-TV, a TV station located in Portsmouth, Virginia, United States
 Wavy Gravy (born 1936), an American entertainer and activist
Waviness, the measurement of the more widely spaced component of surface texture
Wavy the Creator, recording artist
Deschampsia flexuosa, commonly known as wavy hair-grass

See also
"Wavey", a 2017 song by Cliq
 Wave (disambiguation)